Chief Chuck Nduka-Eze (born 12 March 1963) is an Anglo-Nigerian lawyer, activist and entrepreneur. He represented the Anioma Community at the special panel of The Human Rights Violation Investigation Commission of Nigeria (the Oputa Panel), in 1999 in respect of the genocide they experienced during the Nigerian Civil War. He is the son of the nationalist, trade Union activist, and lawyer Sylvester Nduka-Eze.

Early life 
Nduka-Eze was born to Sylvester Nduka-Eze, of Umuaji, Asaba (more commonly known as Nduka Eze) in London, on March 12, 1963. His father was a legendary nationalist, trade unionist, and workers rights activist, who led the United African Company (UAC) workers strike of 1950. His mother Rose Nduka-Eze, was a registered nurse and midwife, and the daughter of Obi Okechukwu Mordi of Umuonaje, Asaba. She was however tragically murdered in the course of the Asaba massacre which occurred in October 1967, during the Nigerian Civil War.

Chuck Nduka-Eze attended CMS Primary School Asaba, between 1970–1975; CMS Grammar School, Lagos, between 1975–1980. Thelveton Hall School, Diss, Norfolk, between 1980–1982. He attended the University of Warwick, and the University of Jos, Nigeria from 1982–1987, graduating with a Bachelor of Laws (Honours) Degree in 1987. He attended the Nigerian Law School between 1987–1988 and was admitted as a Solicitor and Advocate of the Supreme Court of Nigeria in 1988. He trained at the Middle Temple, London, and was called to the English Bar in 1990. He was also called to the bar of the State of California, in 1994.

Professional career 
He was a member of 2 Paper Buildings, Temple, London, headed by Sir Desmond De Silva QC - a common law chambers set- between 1990 - 1994. He was appointed a Senior Crown Counsel, in the Crown Prosecution Service in 1994, and handled a broad of range of prosecutions. One of these being R v Bridger [1994], in which he successfully obtained a conviction of a defendant who had vandalized the work of the popular artist, Damien Hirst, the same of which was the subject of a BBC drama. He was also prosecuting counsel in R v Morris [1994], in which the defendant was found guilty of the harassment of the complainant, an employee of Conservative MP, Bill Cash. He was also prosecuting counsel in R v Devereux, involving a British national Rugby player. He returned to the bar in 1997 and practised in chambers till 1999 when he returned to Nigeria to serve as Company Secretary and Legal Adviser of Diamond Bank (now Access Bank), where he worked till 2001.

Representation of the Anioma Community at the Oputa Panel 
Upon constitution of the special panel of The Human Rights Violation Investigation Commission of Nigeria (the Oputa Panel), he was instructed by Emma Okocha, the author of the work 'Blood on the Niger' as counsel, (on a pro-bono basis) to represent Okocha and the Anioma community in Delta State, on the presentation of a Genocide petition relating to the unlawful killings of civilians in Asaba and other communities of Anioma during the Nigerian Civil War. The panel heard several first-hand witnesses, in support of the petition, and in conclusion, the Federal Government of Nigeria accepted the claims in the petition.

Personal life 
He is married to Fatima Laraba Nduka-Eze, (née Garba), a lawyer and the daughter of late Major-General Joseph Garba, former Nigerian Minister of Foreign Affairs and Permanent Representative to the United Nations. They have three children. Nduka-Eze holds the chieftaincy titles of 'Isama' of Asaba, 'Nwabunia' of Enugwu-Ukwu, and 'Ike Obodo' of Nteje.

References 

 Remembering the life and times of Nduka-Eze The Guardian Nigeria October 5, 2020
 Asaba Massacre Memorial Monument Interview with Chuck Nduka-Eze
 Asaba Massacre: Trauma, Memory and the Nigerian Civil War - Liz Bird/Fraser Otanelli (Inteerview with Chuck Nduka-Eze) p. 51
 Asaba Memorial Project Interview "Chuck Nduka-Eze, whose mother was killed by soldiers at Asaba, presented the case to the Oputa Panel. He talks of the importance of recognition, and the need for a fitting memorial"
 Biography of Chuck Nduka-Eze www.chuckndukaezeandco.com
 Nduka-Eze and the original members of the Asaba October 7 Sun News Online, October 4 2017
 Report From Asaba USF (University of South Florida) Magazine Winter 2011
 Dyed-in-the-wool expressionist found guilty: A controversial artist gave evidence in court yesterday in the case of a man who savaged his sheep. Independent August 18, 1994
 Nigerian Political Parties: Power in an Emergent African Nation - Richard Sklar p. 78 (Reference to Nduka Eze's leadership of UAC Trade Union strike of 1950).

1963 births
Living people
Alumni of the University of Warwick
University of Jos alumni
Nigerian Law School alumni
21st-century Nigerian lawyers
20th-century English lawyers
California lawyers